James Fox (1817 – September 23, 1883) was a merchant and political figure in Newfoundland. He was a member of the Legislative Council of Newfoundland from 1879 to 1883.

He was born in Harbour Grace and operated a fishing supply business in St. John's with his brother John. Fox died in St. John's in 1883.

He was the father of James Patrick Fox who later served in the Newfoundland assembly.

References 
 

Members of the Legislative Council of Newfoundland
1817 births
1883 deaths
Newfoundland Colony people